Ferdinand B. Smith (–) was a one term Democratic mayor of Norwalk, Connecticut from 1903 to 1904.

He ran again in 1907, but was defeated by Charles A. Scofield.

Associations 
 Eminent Commander, Clinton Commandery Number 3, Knights Templar.
 member (1884), St John's Number 6 Lodge of Masons

References 

Mayors of Norwalk, Connecticut
Connecticut Democrats
American Freemasons
Year of birth missing
Year of death missing